Brain and Behavior is a monthly peer-reviewed open access scientific journal covering neurology, neuroscience, psychology, and psychiatry. It was established in 2011 and is published by Wiley-Blackwell. The editor-in-chief is Nutan Sharma (Massachusetts General Hospital).

The journal accepts direct submissions as well as submissions referred to them by other Wiley-Blackwell journals. Some of those journals are owned by societies and their members are eligible for discounted publication charges.

Abstracting and indexing 
The journal is abstracted and indexed in:

According to the Journal Citation Reports, the journal has a 2017 impact factor of 2.219.

References

External links 
 

Neuroscience journals
Psychiatry journals
Wiley-Blackwell academic journals
Monthly journals
Creative Commons Attribution-licensed journals
Publications established in 2011
English-language journals